Deoban is a mountain of Garhwal Himalaya in Uttarakhand, India. Deoban stands at 6855 meter 22490 feet. Its joint 28th highest located entirely within the uttrakhand India. Nanda Devi, is the highest mountain in this category. Deoban is the 396th highest peak in the world. Deoban located just south east of Mana Peak and west of Bidhan. on the south west side lies the Mandir Parbat.

Climbing history

The first ascent of Deoban by Britishers by Frank Smythe's party On 4 August 1937. A twelve-member Indian Military Academy team climbed Deoban 1968. In August 2009 a nine members team of Ordinance Factories Mountaineers & Trekkers from west Bengal Led by Samrat Basu. In the post monsoon season approached Deoban from the Amrit Ganga valley. They established their base camp on the right bank of Amrit Ganga at Eri Udiyar. Camp 3 was established on Upper Bidhan glacier and summit camp at 6320 meter. They climbed the northwest ridge and finally reached via the west ridge. On 28 August Samrat Basu with Ashim Ghosh, Tapas Dey, Prosenjit Bagchi along with 4 high altitude supporters reached the summit.

Glaciers and rivers

It is surrounded by glaciers on both sides, the Purbi Kamet Glacier, on the northern side and the Bidhan Glacier on the southern side. The River Dhauli Ganga emerges from Purbi Kamet Glacier and met Alaknanda river at Vishnu Prayag an 82 km journey from its mouth. Alaknanda river is one of the main tributaries of Ganga.

Neighboring peaks

The neighboring peaks of Deoban:
 Kamet: 
 Mana Peak: 
 Mana Northwest: 
 Bidhan: 
 Mandir Parbat:

See also
 List of Himalayan peaks of Uttarakhand

References

Mountains of Uttarakhand
Six-thousanders of the Himalayas
Geography of Chamoli district